Kafue District is a district of Zambia, located in Lusaka Province. The capital lies at Kafue. As of the 2000 Zambian Census, the district had a population of 150,217 people. Kafue has many business areas to invest in. There are more services one can benefit from within the district, from financial services to shopping and fishing.

Before 1997, Kafue District, together with Chongwe District and Rufunsa District, was known as "Lusaka Rural".

References

 
Districts of Lusaka Province